Penn College may refer to two post-secondary schools in the United States:

 William Penn University, a private university in Iowa previously called Penn College
 Pennsylvania College of Technology, a college affiliated with the Pennsylvania State University whose name is commonly abbreviated to Penn College

See also
University of Pennsylvania, an Ivy-League university located in Philadelphia 
Penn State, a state-related land-grant university located in State College, Pennsylvania